Eden English Boarding High School is a school located in Butwal city, Rupandehi District. Though the school is located on Butwal Sub-metro but focuses on the students to be collected from mid-urban communities of nearby areas.

See also 
 Education in Nepal
 Higher Secondary Education Board

References 

Boarding schools in Nepal
Butwal
Rupandehi District
1994 establishments in Nepal